Xysticus pellax is a species of crab spider in the family Thomisidae. It is found in North America.

References

Further reading

 
 
 

Thomisidae
Spiders described in 1894